John Shapleigh may refer to:

John Shapleigh (died 1414), MP for Exeter
John Shapleigh (fl. 1414–1427), MP for Exeter